Relicina colombiana is a species of lichen in the family Parmeliaceae. Known from Colombia, it was described as new to science in 2011.

References

Parmeliaceae
Lichen species
Lichens of Colombia
Lichens described in 2011
Taxa named by John Alan Elix
Taxa named by Harrie Sipman